Wharfside is a Metrolink tram stop on the Trafford Park Line. It is located on Trafford Wharf Road, next to the Manchester Ship Canal and close to Manchester United's Old Trafford football stadium. It was originally proposed that the station be named Manchester United. It opened on 22 March 2020.

Services
From this stop a service runs generally every 12 minutes towards Cornbrook and towards the Trafford Centre.

References

Tram stops in Trafford
Railway stations in Great Britain opened in 2020
Salford Quays